Bactra noteraula is a species of moth of the family Tortricidae first described by Thomas de Grey, 6th Baron Walsingham in 1907. It is endemic to New Zealand.

References

Moths described in 1907
Bactrini
Endemic fauna of New Zealand
Moths of New Zealand
Endemic moths of New Zealand